The 1982 PGA Championship was the 64th PGA Championship, held August 5–8 at Southern Hills Country Club in Tulsa, Oklahoma. Raymond Floyd won his second PGA Championship, three strokes ahead of runner-up Lanny Wadkins, the 1977 champion. A few weeks shy of age 40, Floyd shot an opening round 63 (−7) and led wire-to-wire to secure the third of his four major titles. He won his first PGA Championship thirteen years earlier, in 1969.

Temperatures exceeded  during the first two rounds and after a third round 68 (−2), Floyd was at 200 (−10), five shots ahead of Greg Norman and Jay Haas. At the end of a lackluster final round, Floyd had an opportunity to break the PGA's 72-hole record of 271, set 18 years earlier by Bobby Nichols in 1964, but double-bogeyed the final hole. The record lasted a dozen more years, until broken by Nick Price in 1994.

The winner's share of $65,000 was the last in five figures at the PGA Championship. It rose over 50% to $100,000 the following year and to $125,000 in 1984, nearly doubling in just two years.

This was the fourth major for Southern Hills, which previously hosted the PGA Championship in 1970 and the U.S. Open in 1958 and 1977. The PGA Championship returned in 1994 and 2007 and the U.S. Open in 2001.

Floyd's win marked the tenth and most recent time that all four major championships were won by Americans in a calendar year.

Course layout

Past champions in the field

Made the cut

Missed the cut 

Source:

Round summaries

First round
Thursday, August 5, 1982

Source:

Second round
Friday, August 6, 1982

Source:

Third round
Saturday, August 7, 1982

Source:

Final round
Sunday, August 8, 1982

Source:

Scorecard

Final round

Cumulative tournament scores, relative to par
Source:

References

External links
PGA.com – 1982 PGA Championship 

PGA Championship
Golf in Oklahoma
Sports in Tulsa, Oklahoma
PGA Championship
PGA Championship
PGA Championship
PGA Championship